India competed at the 2006 Asian Games held in Doha, Qatar. India ranked 8th with 10 gold medals.

Medal summary

Medal table

Medalists

Gold (10) 
 Pankaj Advani (Cue Sports :: Men English Billiard Singles)
 Humpy Koneru (Chess :: Women's Rapid)
 Jaspal Rana (Shooting :: Men's 25 m Centre Fire Pistol, Men's 25 m Standard Pistol)
 Leander Paes & Mahesh Bhupathi (Tennis :: Men's Doubles)
 Leander Paes & Sania Mirza (Tennis :: Mixed Doubles)
 Athletics :: Women's 4 × 400 m Relay
 GEETHA Sati
 KAUR Manjeet
 KULATHUMMURIYIL Chitra
 Pinki Pramanik
 Kabaddi :: Men
 Shooting :: Men's 25 m Centre Fire Pistol Team
 JUNG Samresh
 KUMAR Vijay
 RANA Jaspal
 Chess :: Mixed Team's Classical
 KONERU Humpy
 KRISHNAN Sasikiran
 PENTALA Harikrishna

Silver (17)
 Manjeet Kaur (Athletics :: 400 m)
 Santhi Soudarajan (Athletics :: 800 m)
 Anju Bobby George (Athletics :: Long Jump)
 Soma Biswas (Athletics :: Heptathlon)
 Ashok Shandiliya (Billiards :: Singles)
 Bajranglal Takhar (Rowing :: Single Sculls)
 Manavjit Singh Sandhu (Shooting :: Trap)
 Sania Mirza (Tennis :: Singles)
 Geetika Jakhar (Wrestling :: 63 kg Freestyle)
 Golf (Men)
 Rowing :: Single Sculls (Men)
 Rowing :: Fours (Men)
 Sailing :: Beneteau 7.5
 Shooting :: 25 m Standard Pistol (Men)
 Shooting :: Trap (Men)
 Shooting :: Double Trap (Men)
 Shooting :: 10 m Air Pistol (Women)
 Tennis (Women)

Bronze (26)
 Sinimol Paulose (Athletics :: 1500 m)
 O. P. Jaisha (Athletics :: 5000 m)
 J. J. Shobha (Athletics :: Heptathlon)
 Krishna Punia (Athletics :: Discus Throw)
 Geet Sethi & Ashok Shandiliya (Billiards :: Doubles)
 Vijender Kumar (Boxing :: Middleweight)
 Johnson Varghese (Boxing :: Super Heavyweight)
 Bijender Singh & Kiran Yalamanchi (Rowing :: Lightweight Double Sculls)
 Rajesh Choudhary (Sailing :: Laser Radial)
 Rajyavardhan Singh Rathore (Shooting :: Double Trap)
 Gagan Narang (Shooting :: 50 m Rifle 3 Positions)
 Vijay Kumar (Shooting :: 25m Rapid Fire Pistol)
 Saurav Ghosal (Squash :: Singles)
 Vinayak Dalvi (Wrestling :: 55 kg Greco-Roman)
 Alka Tomar (Wrestling :: 55 kg Freestyle)
 Yogeshwar Dutt (Wrestling :: 60 kg Freestyle)
 Sushil Kumar (Wrestling :: Men's Freestyle 66 kg)
 Palwinder Singh Cheema (Wrestling :: Men's Freestyle 120 kg)
 Bimoljit Singh (Wushu :: 60 kg)
 Archery (Men)
 Equestrian :: Eventing
 Hockey (Women)
 Shooting :: 10 m Air Rifle (Men)
 Shooting :: 10 m Air Rifle (Women)
 Shooting :: 50 m Rifle 3 Positions (Men)
 Snooker (Men)

Medal Performance

References

Nations at the 2006 Asian Games
2006
Asian Games